La Unión Municipality may refer to:
Colombia
La Unión, Antioquia
La Unión, Nariño
La Unión, Sucre
La Unión, Valle del Cauca
El Salvador
La Unión, El Salvador
Honduras
 La Unión, Copán
 La Unión, Olancho

Municipality name disambiguation pages